Campanhã is a Portuguese freguesia ("civil parish"), located in the city of Porto. The population in 2011 was 32,659, in an area of 8.04 km². Located there is the Campanhã station, the most important in Porto.

References

Parishes of Porto